Pseudorhaphitoma naganumaensis is a small sea snail (a marine gastropod mollusk) in the family Mangeliidae. P. Naganumaensis was discovered by otuka in 1935

Description

Distribution
P. Naganumaensis marine species occurs off the Noto peninsula,  Japan

References

External links
 
 Pseudorhaphitoma naganumaensis; The University Museum, University of Tokyo
 Worldwide Mollusc Species Database : photo

naganumaensis
Gastropods described in 1935